Mark Farrow was named Designer of the Year in the Creative Review Peer Poll in 2004, voting him ‘the most important graphic designer working today’. His career began in the early 1980s designing experimental sleeves and posters for Factory Records, and The Haçienda, which placed him at the forefront of contemporary music graphic design. This has since continued with a longstanding creative partnership with Pet Shop Boys, and other bands such as Spiritualized. He designed the cover for Everything Must Go (1996), the breakthrough album by the Manic Street Preachers. His minimalist approach, and a rigorous, highly precise attention to detail defines his aesthetic, and appeals to a broad spectrum of clients, from museums and galleries to pop music and retail, product designers and architects, to restaurateurs and artists. In 2009 he was given the honour of Royal Designer for Industry (RDI) by the RSA.

References

External links
Farrow Design official website

English graphic designers
British graphic designers
Living people
Factory Records
Year of birth missing (living people)